Arne Brustad (14 April 1912 – 22 August 1987) was a Norwegian footballer. He is regarded as one of the country's best players of all time.

Career
Brustad was an outside-left for Lyn. He won 33 caps for Norway, and scored 17 international goals. He was a member of Norway's "Bronze Team" from the 1936 Olympics.

Brustad, who made his international debut in 1935, was one of the star players of the Berlin Olympics, where he scored five goals in four matches, including all three goals in Norway's 3–2 win against Poland in the third-place match.

In 1938, Brustad was a member of Norway's World Cup team. Norway were knocked out in the first round by eventual champions Italy after extra time by a score of 2–1. Brustad scored the Norwegian goal shortly before the end of normal time, and also added a second a few minutes later, but this goal was controversially disallowed for offside. Later the same year, Brustad was named in the "Rest of Europe XI" that played England at Highbury.

At club level, Brustad played for Lyn from 1930 to 1948, winning the Norwegian Cup in 1945 and 1946.

Honours
Norway
Summer Olympics bronze medal: 1936

Lyn
Norwegian Cup: 1945, 1946

References

External links
 
 
 

1912 births
1987 deaths
Norwegian footballers
Norway international footballers
Lyn Fotball players
1938 FIFA World Cup players
Footballers at the 1936 Summer Olympics
Olympic footballers of Norway
Olympic bronze medalists for Norway
Olympic medalists in football
Medalists at the 1936 Summer Olympics
Association football forwards
Footballers from Oslo